The 1930 Rangoon riots were a pair of race riots between Indian dockworkers and Burman labourers. The first broke out on 26 May near the Rangoon docks. It spread to nearby districts with high Indian populations and resulted in over one hundred killed and about one thousand injured. The second, a prison riot, began on 24 June in Rangoon Central Jail, where the staff was predominantly Indian and the inmates overwhelmingly Burman. The riots were overshadowed by the Saya San rebellion that erupted in December that year.

In early May 1930—in the midst of the Great Depression—Indian dockworkers in Rangoon went on strike for increased wages. Burman labourers were brought in to break the strike, but the port became congested. An agreement was reached with the Indians to raise their wages, whereupon the Burmans were dismissed. As they returned to work the Indians jeered the outgoing Burmans and violence ensued. For days Burman mobs, often composed of toughs imported from other neighbourhoods, roamed about for Indians, who barricaded themselves in their homes and, in one case, in the local lunatic asylum. Order was only restored when the Rangoon garrison, the Cameron Highlanders, was sent in. According to British colonial government sources, roughly 120 people of Indian origin were killed and more than 900 were injured. However, more recent analyses estimate that more than 200 were killed and 2,000 injured. The majority of all killed and wounded was Indian.

The riot in the jail was a lesser mirror image of the dockyard riots. The Indian prison staff killed, mainly by gunshot, 34 inmates (out of 2,000) and injured 60 others.

Notes

References

History of Myanmar
Race riots
1930 riots
Indian diaspora in Myanmar
May 1930 events
June 1930 events
20th century in Yangon
1930 in Burma